The Valdostan regional election of 2003 took place on 8 June 2003. The election was characterized by a strong showing of the centrist Valdostan Union, which gained more than 47% of votes.

Results

Elections in Aosta Valley
2003 elections in Italy
June 2003 events in Europe